The Shapre-Monte House is a historic house in Phenix City, Alabama, U.S.. It was built circa 1890 by the Sharpe brothers. It was later purchased by Jacob G. Monte, a tailor from the Netherlands, and it remained in the Monte family until 1968. It has been listed on the National Register of Historic Places since November 3, 1983.

References

Houses on the National Register of Historic Places in Alabama
Victorian architecture in Alabama
Houses completed in 1890
Houses in Russell County, Alabama